Amersfoort Schothorst is a railway station on the Utrecht–Kampen railway between Amersfoort and Zwolle. It is located in north Amersfoort, Netherlands. The station is operated by Nederlandse Spoorwegen (NS).

History
The station opened in 1987 as a suburban complement to the main Amersfoort railway station. The station serves the suburban areas of Schothorst, Zielhorst, Liendert and Rustenburg and the industrial area of De Hoef.

The station used to be the terminus for trains originating from the wide Amsterdam region, such as Hoofddorp,  Alkmaar and Amsterdam Centraal; a third track was constructed enabling these services in 1997. When a second suburban station, Amersfoort Vathorst opened to the north of Schothorst in May 2006, regional services (Sprinters) terminating in Vathorst. The spare third track has been used, as of December 2007, as the terminus for Intercity trains originating from Rotterdam Centraal.

Train services
, the following train services call at this station:
Express services:
Intercity: Schiphol - Hilversum - Amersfoort Schothorst
Intercity: The Hague - Utrecht - Amersfoort Schothorst
Local services:
Sprinter: Utrecht - Amersfoort - Zwolle
Sprinter: Hoofddorp - Amsterdam - Hilversum - Amersfoort Vathorst

External links
NS website 
Dutch Public Transport journey planner 

Schothorst
Railway stations opened in 1987
Railway stations on the Centraalspoorweg